John Ewbank (born 6 December 1968) is a British-born Dutch composer, lyricist and record producer. He was born in Eastleigh, Hampshire; he and his family moved with the latter to the Netherlands when he was one year old.

He wrote/produced a record number of twenty #1 Dutch Top 40 hit singles, of which fourteen were for Marco Borsato, for whom he has been producing and writing since 1994. They sold over four million albums together in the Benelux. Other artists Ewbank worked with include Ferry Corsten, Trijntje Oosterhuis, VanVelzen, Esmée Denters, Gordon, Paul de Leeuw, Rob de Nijs, Nikki Kerkhof, Hero, Maud Mulder, and Tim Immers.

The first #1 in 1991 with Gordon, "Kon ik maar even bij je zijn" ("If only I could be with you for a short while"), a song which reached the #1 position for the second time in October 2009, when covered by Thomas Berge. In 1996, Ewbank composed the anthem for the opening of the Amsterdam Arena. His music is featured in Quentin Tarantino's True Romance. He composed scores for the films  with Charlotte Rampling and for Floris. In 2002, Ewbank worked with Ferry Corsten on Corsten's latest production under his 'Gouryella' alias, "Ligaya". He also wrote and produced the #1 hit for the Dutch Idols winner Nikki in 2008 ("Hello World"). 

He also musically directed the 'Symfonica in Rosso' spectacle in September 2009 featuring Lionel Richie, for which he wrote the duet "Face in the Crowd" for Richie and Trijntje Oosterhuis, which went to #3 in the charts and was musical director for the sequel in 2010 with Diana Ross.

In April 2013 he was commissioned to compose the official song for the investiture of king Willem-Alexander. The song was released on 19 April, causing much controversy and Ewbank decided to withdraw it due to threats and allegations in the social media. A couple of days later, however, the committee plead against the withdrawal of the song. The song went to #1 in all the charts.

He has worked on two musicals, the musical version of Carmen under direction of Cirque de Soleil's Franco Dragone, workshopped in La Jolla Playhouse, San Diego, in June 2007 and a new musical @16, scheduled for presentation in May 2013 in NY, both written with Sarah Miles and AnnMarie Milazzo, produced by Robin Delevita.

Among his latest work is a remix of This Is What It Feels Like by Armin van Buuren - featuring Trevor Guthrie, entering the British charts at #6 in May 2013.

References

External links

1968 births
Dutch composers
Dutch people of English descent
Dutch record producers
Dutch songwriters
Living people
People from Eastleigh
Musicians from Hampshire